The Greer Depot is a former railroad depot listed on the National Register of Historic Places and located in Greer, South Carolina. The combination passenger station and freight warehouse was designed by the Charlotte, North Carolina-based architect, Charles Christian Hook, and constructed in 1913 for the Piedmont and Northern Railway. It is the last surviving of the original 5 two-story depots built for the railway.

The building combines a one-story warehouse and a two-story station. It has a yellow brick exterior on a wider red brick base. The hip roof is covered in red clay tile supported by a wood truss and timber plank system. The second story room of the depot served as the city hall for Greer until the 1930s and then served as a record storage room until the 1950s. The depot, which had been boarded up and unused, now has its interior space divided to create space for businesses.

References

National Register of Historic Places in Greenville County, South Carolina
Railway stations in the United States opened in 1913
Railway stations on the National Register of Historic Places in South Carolina
Greer, South Carolina
Seaboard Air Line Railroad stations
1913 establishments in South Carolina
Former railway stations in South Carolina